Saint Menas may refer to:

People 
 St. Menas of Constantinople (?-552), patriarch
 St. Menas of Egypt (285-), Coptic martyr
 St. Menas of Sinai (6th century), ascetic
 St. Menas of Samnium (6th century), Italian hermit

Churches 
 Agios Minas Cathedral (Saint Menas), Heraklion, Greece
 Church of Saint Menas, Cairo, Egypt
 Church of Saint Menas of Samatya, Istanbul, Turkey
 Monastery of Saint Mina (Menas), Alexandria, Egypt
 San Menna (Saint Menas), an ancient church in Rome, Italy

See also 
 Menas (disambiguation)
 St. Minias of Florence, a saint with a similar name

Menas